Live is a live album by the glam metal band Kix, recorded at the University of Maryland's Ritchie Coliseum in October 1991. It was released in 1993 on Atlantic Records.

Track listing
 "Hot Wire" (Donnie Purnell, Taylor Rhodes) – 6:05
 "Same Jane" (Purnell, Bob Halligan Jr.) – 4:54
 "Rock and Roll Overdose" (Purnell, Rhodes) – 4:27
 "Sex" (Purnell, Steve Whiteman) – 4:42
 "The Itch" (Purnell) – 6:28
 "For Shame" (Purnell)– 5:34
 "Tear Down the Walls"  (Purnell, Rhodes) – 4:47
 "Blow My Fuse" (Purnell) – 5:52
 "Girl Money" (Purnell, Rhodes) – 7:06
 "Cold Blood" (Purnell, Rhodes) – 6:32
 "Don't Close Your Eyes" (Purnell, Halligan Jr., John Palumbo) – 4:25
 "Yeah, Yeah, Yeah" (Brian Forsythe, Purnell, Jimmy Chalfant, Ronnie Younkins, Whiteman) – 13:50

Personnel
Kix
Steve Whiteman – lead vocals, harmonica, saxophone, acoustic guitar
Ronnie "10/10" Younkins – guitars, backing vocals
Brian "Damage" Forsythe – guitars
Donnie Purnell – bass, keyboards, piano, backing vocals, producer, mixing
Jimmy "Chocolate" Chalfant – drums, percussion, backing vocals, mixing

Production
Garth Micheal – engineer
Steve Weinkam – assistant engineer
Fred Derby – mixing
Larry Freemantle – art direction

References

External links
Kix Official Website

Kix (band) albums
1993 live albums
Atlantic Records live albums